Vicente González Moreno (9 December 1778, Cádiz – 6 September 1839) was a Spanish general who supported the Carlists during the First Carlist War.  He was appointed commander of Carlist forces after the death of Zumalacárregui.

As a cadet, he participated in the Spanish War of Independence, achieving the rank of brigadier.  He declared himself in support of the Carlist uprising in 1832.  He was imprisoned but managed to escape to Portugal and join the retinue of Don Carlos, with whom he traveled to England.  He returned to Spain in 1835.

He lost the Battle of Mendigorria in 1835.

An enemy of Rafael Maroto, he opposed the so-called Convenio de Vergara, the agreement that ended the First Carlist War.  He fled to France but was assassinated by Carlist soldiers at Urdax on 6 September 1839.

External links
 Antonio Pirala. Vindicación del general Maroto y manifiesto razonado de las causas del Convenio de Vergara. Urgoiti editores, Pamplona 2005. 

1778 births
1839 deaths
People from Cádiz
Carlism
Military personnel of the First Carlist War
Spanish generals
Assassinated military personnel
Spanish military personnel of the Napoleonic Wars